The Bare-handed Pelota Second League is the second most important hand-pelota tournament. The championship has been played since 1957 and has been the previous scenario for future 1st category pelotaris such as Retegi I, Retegi II, Arretxe, Beloki I and Olaizola II.
The winner of the tournament earns the right to participate in the next edition of the Bare-handed Pelota First League

Championships

Basque pelota competitions
Sports leagues established in 1957